Air Conditioning is the debut studio album by English progressive rock band Curved Air. It was released in November 1970 and reached number 8 in the UK albums chart in December 1970.

On the picture disc (subsequently used as the album cover) the album title was shown as "Airconditioning", while the subsequent green label issue had it as "Air Conditioning".

Background and recording
Though Sonja Kristina is credited as the sole lyricist of "It Happened Today", in a series of interviews conducted from late 1998 through March 1999, Francis Monkman claimed to have conceived the song's title and basic lyrical concept. Kristina concurred that Monkman came up with the title but asserts that the lyric "isn't really about anything specific." In contrast, though "Propositions" is credited solely to Monkman, he denies having written the lyrics and suggests that they were written by Kristina. He explained the inspiration for the song's music: "I was a great fan of Terry Riley (having played in the 1st London performance of "In C" in 1968) and was very impressed by A Rainbow in Curved Air. Then I had a kind of "musical vision" of a high-energy rock sound going into a Terry-like tape-loop improvisation. That became "Propositions"..."

Both music and lyrics for "Situations" were written jointly by Darryl Way and Rob Martin. Martin recalled that their collaboration on the song was so tight that often each melody was produced alternately by first one composer, then the other.

The lyric of "Hide and Seek" describes a post-apocalyptic scenario in which a lone survivor searches in vain for another living person; Sonja Kristina has stated that this lyric can be taken literally or symbolically. She commented, "It's a nightmare, the sort of thing when you dream about being left in an empty city."

Kristina's vocal on "Blind Man" was inspired by Donovan's performance on "Hurdy Gurdy Man".

Picture disc
The album was one of the first vinyl picture discs to be produced, and it was released as a limited edition of 10,000. Picture disc technology was in its infancy and this resulted in a level of surface noise.  The disc was re-issued in conventional album format (the "Green Label" edition), with a photo of the original picture disc on the album cover.

Reception

Track listing

Side one
 "It Happened Today" (Francis Monkman, Sonja Kristina Linwood) – 4:55
 "Stretch" (Darryl Way, Monkman) – 4:05
 "Screw" (Way, Linwood) – 4:03
 "Blind Man" (Way, Rob Martin) – 3:32
 "Vivaldi" (Way) – 7:26

Side two
 "Hide and Seek" (Way, Linwood) – 6:15
 "Propositions" (Monkman) – 3:04
 "Rob One" (Martin) – 3:22
 "Situations" (Way, Martin) – 6:17
 "Vivaldi (With Cannons)" (Way, Monkman) – 1:35

One other song was recorded and released only on singles:
 "What Happens When You Blow Yourself Up" (Monkman, Linwood)  – 3:34

Personnel
Though Rob Martin is credited for bass, he had already left the band due to a hand injury prior to recording, and Sonja Kristina revealed in an interview that Francis Monkman played all of the bass parts on the album.

Curved Air
 Sonja Kristina – lead vocals
 Darryl Way – electric violin and vocals
 Francis Monkman – lead guitar, organ, piano, mellotron, electric harpsichord, special effects, equipment, and VCS3 synthesizer
 Rob Martin – bass guitar
 Florian Pilkington-Miksa – drums

Singles
"It Happened Today" / "What Happens When You Blow Yourself Up" b/w "Vivaldi" (UK & The Netherlands release)
"It Happened Today" b/w "What Happens When You Blow Yourself Up" (US & Germany release)
"It Happened Today" b/w "It Happened Today" (promo issue)
"Vivaldi" b/w "It Happened Today" (Italy release)

References

1970 debut albums
Curved Air albums
Warner Records albums
Art rock albums by English artists